The Indian locomotive class WAM- 2/3 is a class of 25 kV AC electric locomotives that was imported from Japan in 1960s for Indian Railways. The model name stands for broad gauge (W), AC Current (A), Mixed traffic (M) engine, 2nd (2). A total of 38 WAM-2/3 locomotives were built by The Japanese Group (a consortium of Mitsubishi, Hitachi and Toshiba) between 1960 and 1964. They entered service in 1960.

The WAM-2/3 served both passenger and freight trains for over 40 years. As of January 2020, All locomotives have been removed from service all and were scrapped.

History
These locomotives were built by a consortium of Mitsubishi, Hitachi and Toshiba (The Japanese Group, as attested by a plaque fixed on their sides) as a second option to the Europeans WAM-1. They were delivered in 1960 and were a bit lower powered than the WAM1 but had similar Bo-Bo wheel arrangement (4 wheels per bogie) with four Mitsubishi DC traction motors connected to the wheels permanently in parallel through a WN geared drive. The WAM2 had Ignitron rectifiers just like the WAM1 but some were later were refitted with Excitron rectifiers. Some even had the Mitsubishi logo painted on their sides.

38 of these were produced in two batches with the initial batch of 10 locos having air brakes for the loco and vacuum train brakes, and the second batch of 26 having only vacuum brakes. These have not been retrofitted with air train brakes. Like the WAM1 they were also used around the ER-SER-NER-NR circuit as it was the first AC electrified area and hauled ordinary passenger trains and freights only and sometimes ran all the way to New Delhi via Kanpur. They were also used double-headed for freight trains. They had Four traction motors permanently coupled in parallel are fed by ignitron rectifiers. Speed control is by a tap changer on the input transformer. Mitsubishi transformer, 20 taps. Oerlikon exhauster and compressor, Arno rotary converter. They were homed at Asansol Loco Shed of Eastern Railways.

In February 1980, the WAM-2/3 classes got there speed upgraded from 100 km/h to 120 km/h by RDSO. This was done for haulage of the Howrah Rajdhani between Howrah and Ghazibad on the Eastern and Northern railway division respectively. When the Sealdah suburban system was electrified under AC, there was a shortage of AC EMU's and so on an interim basis some WAM-2 units were used on push pull rake with WAM2 in the middle was used as EMUs before supplies were received and ER also retrofitted DC EMU stock, though the latter largely operated in HWH division which required dual voltage capability.

Circulars at that time said condemnation of over aged E locos should be done because the locos have achieved their codal life of 35 years. Since they had less than five years of codal life left, all WAM-2/3 locos were Vacuum Brake stock were never considered for up-gradation to Air Brake / Dual Brake . The lifespan of certain WAM-2/3 locos could certainly be extended another five years of revenue service since they were in great condition . Instead, orders were in place to rapidly decommission these locos. It happened in such a hurry that not a single WAM-2/WAM-3 locos could be preserved or plinthed in process

Sub Classes

WAM-3 

The WAM3 class consisted of two modified WAM2 locomotives, #20333 and #20337 of the Asansol ASN shed of Eastern Railway. They were rebuilt with their Pantographs aligned the other way around (pointing outwards) and fitted with silicon diode rectifiers as permanent feature thereby increasing their performance and durability, but were identical to the WAM2 in every other respect. These two were used to haul (then) prestigious trains like the Kalka Mail and Toofan Express to Delhi, but were later relegated to passenger duties and shunting as WAM4s became common. Both are scrapped now.

WAP-2 

Four WAM-2s of  Asansol shed were re-geared with the intention of increasing the speed of the class. The Bo-Bo bogies and WN geared drives of the WAM-2 replaced by the WAP1 Co-Co Flexicoil fabricated bogies and axle hung traction motors respectively,. These ran for quite some time and even hauled the Howrah Rajdhani for some time but were all scrapped in the late 1980s. They were not put in WAP1 shells. They are considered a failed experiment

Locomotive shed 
 All the locomotives of this classes has been withdrawn from service.

See also

Rail transport in India#History
Indian Railways
Locomotives of India
Rail transport in India

References

External links 
[IRFCA] Indian Railways FAQ: Locomotives—Specific classes : AC Electric
[IRFCA] Indian Railways FAQ: Diesel and Electric Locomotive Specifications
11081 Colour Photographs, Indian Railways

25 kV AC locomotives
Bo-Bo locomotives
Electric locomotives of India
Railway locomotives introduced in 1960
5 ft 6 in gauge locomotives
Mitsubishi locomotives
Toshiba locomotives
Hitachi locomotives